Scout Creek  is an urban gully, is located in Hornsby Shire local government area of Sydney, New South Wales, Australia. It is part of the Parramatta River catchment.

Course and features
The creek flows generally south-east by south, through the Baden Powell Scout Training Camp and Pennant Hills Park, before reaching its confluence with the Lane Cove River, between Pennant Hills and South Turramurra, in the Lane Cove National Park.

Scout Creek was formerly known as 'Boy Scout Creek' from when the Boy Scout Camp site was opened in 1927, adjacent to the creek. The name was locally changed to 'Scout Creek' in the 1960s when the term 'Boy' was removed from the title of the Scouts Association.

See also 

 Great North Walk
 Great North Road
 Lane Cove National Park
 Rivers of New South Wales

References 

Creeks and canals of Sydney
Lane Cove River
Hornsby Shire